The Dornier Kiebitz was an unmanned military reconnaissance mobile platform used for battlefield reconnaissance duties such as moving target detection and tracking.

Variants
Do 32K (experimental)
Initial variant using the rotor and BMW 6012 powerplant of the Dornier Do 32 manned helicopter. 
Do 32K Kiebitz I (operational)
Tip jet rotor using air from an Allison 250-C2 driven compressor.
Do 34 Kiebitz II
Larger variant, used for ARGUS (Autonomes Radar Gefechtsfeld Uberwachungs System) battlefield reconnaissance system development.

Specifications (Do 34 Kiebitz)

See also

References

Bibliography

Cyril von Gersdorff, Kurt Knobling and Carl Bode. Helicopters and Gyroplanes. Bernard & Graefe Verlag Publishers. 1999. 
 Taylor, John W.R. Jane's All the World's Aircraft 1972-73., London, Sampson Low, Marston and Company Ltd, 1972. ISBN 354-00109-4. 
 Taylor, John W.R. Jane's All the World's Aircraft 1982-83., London, Jane's Publishing Company Ltd, 1982. . 

1970s military reconnaissance aircraft
Kiebitz
Aircraft first flown in 1970
Helicopters